"Cyber Sex" is a song by American rapper and singer Doja Cat. It was released alongside a music video through Kemosabe and RCA Records on November 7, 2019, as the fourth single from her second studio album Hot Pink, which was released on the same day. Written by Doja Cat, Yeti Beats and Lydia Asrat, the song was also produced by Kool Kojak alongside Tizhimself. It features "90s-esque synth-heavy bubblegum raps".

In the music video, Doja Cat stars as a webcam model who becomes an engineer and genetically develops her ideal sexual partner. The song was popularized by internet meme personality "Queen of Brooklyn" on social media sites such as Twitter and TikTok. It was later certified gold by the Recording Industry Association of America in late November 2020.

Music video 
On November 7, 2019, a music video was released alongside the song. The video was directed by Jack Begert, produced by Psycho Films--including executive producer Sam Canter and producer Geenah Krisht--and commissioned by Sam Houston.

Live performance 
Doja Cat was a musical guest at the 37th annual AVN Awards on January 25, 2020, where she performed "Cyber Sex" as well as "Juicy" in a nude mesh bodysuit with rhinestones covering and highlighting her nipples, butt, and pubic hair. Nylon magazine complimented the outfit calling it, "truly unforgettable".

Credits and personnel
Credits adapted from Hot Pink liner notes.
 
Recording
 Recorded at The Hive & Gold Diggers’ Studios (Los Angeles, California)
 Mixed at Larrabee Sound Studios (North Hollywood, California)
 Mastered at Bernie Grundman Mastering (Hollywood, California)

Personnel

Doja Cat – vocals, songwriting
Tizhimself – songwriting, production
Kool Kojak – songwriting, production
Lydia Asrat – songwriting
David Sprecher – songwriting
Rian Lewis – recording
MacGregor Leo – recording
Jaycen Joshua – mixing
Mike Seaberg – assistant mixing
DJ Riggins – assistant mixing
Mike Bozzi – mastering

Charts

Certifications

References

2019 singles
2019 songs
Doja Cat songs
Songs written by Yeti Beats
Songs written by Doja Cat
Songs written by Kool Kojak
Song recordings produced by Kool Kojak